Kennedys Bush is a south-western suburb of Christchurch, New Zealand.

Thomas Kennedy purchased  of native bush in the Port Hills in 1856. In the late 1850s, Kennedys Bush Road up a spur towards the bush was surveyed, and constructed in 1863.

Halswell Quarry Park is located within Kennedys Bush. The rock formations were first noted by the Deans brothers, who named the outcrop Rock Hill. James Feather and James Forgan opened the quarry in c. 1861. They sold it to Guise Brittan, who took Grosvenor Miles and William White Sr (father of politician of the same name). Brittan sold to the Lincoln Road Tramway Company, and White and William Wilson managed the quarry operations. Wilson took over the quarry, and many important Christchurch buildings were constructed from its stone, including the Canterbury Provincial Council Buildings, Sunnyside Hospital, Durham Street Methodist Church, Canterbury Museum, Normal School, Teachers' College Building, Sign of the Takahe, and the Robert McDougall Art Gallery.

Demographics

Kennedys Bush had a population of 906 at the 2018 New Zealand census, an increase of 57 people (6.7%) since the 2013 census, and an increase of 222 people (32.5%) since the 2006 census. There were 321 households. There were 453 males and 453 females, giving a sex ratio of 1.0 males per female. The median age was 50.2 years (compared with 37.4 years nationally), with 129 people (14.2%) aged under 15 years, 153 (16.9%) aged 15 to 29, 459 (50.7%) aged 30 to 64, and 162 (17.9%) aged 65 or older.

Ethnicities were 94.7% European/Pākehā, 3.0% Māori, 1.3% Pacific peoples, 3.0% Asian, and 2.6% other ethnicities (totals add to more than 100% since people could identify with multiple ethnicities).

The proportion of people born overseas was 20.2%, compared with 27.1% nationally.

Although some people objected to giving their religion, 52.3% had no religion, 40.4% were Christian, 0.7% were Hindu, 0.3% were Buddhist and 1.0% had other religions.

Of those at least 15 years old, 279 (35.9%) people had a bachelor or higher degree, and 72 (9.3%) people had no formal qualifications. The median income was $48,200, compared with $31,800 nationally. The employment status of those at least 15 was that 393 (50.6%) people were employed full-time, 144 (18.5%) were part-time, and 15 (1.9%) were unemployed.

Notes

References

Suburbs of Christchurch
1850s establishments in New Zealand